Laurence Norman Helsby, Baron Helsby  (27 April 1908 – 5 December 1978) was a British civil servant.

Early life
Laurence Helsby was born on 27 April 1908 and educated at Sedbergh School in Cumbria, before studying at Keble College, Oxford. He lectured in economics at the University College of the South West of England (a predecessor institution of the University of Exeter) between 1930 and 1931 and at the University of Durham between 1931 and 1945.

Career
In 1946, he joined the Civil Service, initially as an Assistant Secretary in the Treasury, before becoming Principal Private Secretary to the Prime Minister, Clement Attlee, between 1947 and 1950.

After a period working in the Ministry of Food, he was appointed First Civil Service Commissioner in 1954, transferring in 1959 to become Permanent Secretary of the Ministry of Labour. In 1963, he was made joint Permanent Secretary to the Treasury and Head of the Home Civil Service. Following his retirement, he was created a life peer on 21 May 1968 with the title Baron Helsby, of Logmore in the County of Surrey.

Helsby was made a Companion of the Order of the Bath (CB) in the 1950 New Year Honours, and was advanced to Knight Grand Cross of the Order of the Bath (GCB) in the 1963 New Year Honours; he had also been previously knighted (KBE) in the 1955 New Year Honours.   

He was awarded an Honorary Fellowship of Keble College in 1959, and received honorary degrees from the universities of Exeter and Durham.

Personal life
He married in 1938 to Wölmett whom he had met whilst teaching at Durham. The union produced a son and a daughter. Lord Helsby died on 5 December 1978.

References

1908 births
1978 deaths
British civil servants
Permanent Secretaries of HM Treasury
Permanent Secretaries of the Ministry of Labour
Civil servants in the Ministry of Food
People educated at Sedbergh School
Alumni of Keble College, Oxford
Knights Grand Cross of the Order of the Bath
Knights Commander of the Order of the British Empire
Crossbench life peers
Principal Private Secretaries to the Prime Minister
Life peers created by Elizabeth II